Barilius ngawa is a fish in genus Barilius of the family Cyprinidae.

References

ngawa
Taxa named by Waikhom Vishwanath
Taxa named by Wahengbam Manojkumar
Fish described in 2002